Frederick, Duke of Brunswick and Lüneburg, (28 August 1574 – 10 December 1648) was the Prince of Lüneburg from 1636 to 1648.

Frederick was born on 28 August 1574, the tenth child of William the Younger (Brunswick-Lüneburg) (1535–1592) and Dorothea of Denmark to the New House of Lüneburg.

He became bishop's adjutor in the Bishopric of Ratzeburg and was elected propst (provost) of the Archdiocese of Bremen.

Ancestors

Sources 
 Siebern, Heinrich: Die Kunstdenkmäler der Provinz Hannover. III. Regierungsbezirk Lüneburg, Heft 5, Stadt Celle. Hanover, 1937.

|-

Princes of Lüneburg
17th-century German Roman Catholic priests
1574 births
1648 deaths
Middle House of Lüneburg
New House of Lüneburg